Loomis, Sayles & Company L.P. is an American investment management firm based in Boston. As of March 31, 2021, Loomis Sayles has roughly $347.8 billion in assets under management.

Loomis Sayles was founded in 1926 by Robert H. Loomis and Ralph T. Sayles. In 2000, it was acquired by Natixis Global Asset Management.

Products 
Loomis Sayles offers a variety of products for institutional investor and retail investors. It has institutional clients in 20 countries across six continents. Vehicles include Mutual Funds, Institutional Separate Accounts, Exchange Traded Funds, Managed Accounts, Hedge Funds, Collective Trusts and Other Private Placements.

Strategy 
Loomis Sayles has experimented with a variety of styles, notably including bottom-up, quantitative, and macro.

References

External links
 Loomis Sayles Firm History

Financial services companies established in 1926
Investment management companies of the United States
Companies based in Boston
2000 mergers and acquisitions